The Association Littéraire et Artistique Internationale (ALAI) was founded in 1878 in Paris. Victor Hugo was the honorary president and founder of the association.  The group gave itself the objective of creating an international convention for the protection of writers' and artists' rights, which was achieved eight years later with the Berne Convention on September 9, 1886. It continues to exist today and it is considered one of the premier international organizations that continues to suggest law reform in connection with the movement for international copyright law.

Further reading
Yasser Omar Amine, La mémoire oubliée de l’histoire du droit d’auteur égyptien : Les juristes M. Linant de Bellefonds, M. Pupikofer et E. Piola Caselli ("The Forgotten Memory of the History of the Egyptian Copyright Law : the jurist M. Linant de Bellefonds, M. Pupikofer and E. Piola Caselli"), éd. Dar El Nahda El Arabia, Le Caire, 2014–2015, 602 p. (in Arabic and partly in French)

Jérôme Pacouret, Qu'est-ce qu'un auteur de cinéma ? Copyright, droit d'auteur et division du travail (années 1900-2010) ("What is an author of cinema?  Copyright, author's rights and division of labour (1900-2010)"), PhD. dissertation in sociology, under the supervision of Gisèle Sapiro, EHESS, Paris, 2018, 774 p. (read online)

References

External links
 Official ALAI website
 Official website of ALAI Czech Republic

French writers' organizations
Copyright law organizations
Arts organizations established in 1878
Organizations based in Paris
Intellectual property organizations